The 2017 European 10 m Events Championships were held in Maribor, Slovenia from March 6 to 12, 2017.

Men's events

Women's events

Mixed events

Men's junior events

Women's junior events

Mixed junior events

Medal table

See also
 European Shooting Confederation
 International Shooting Sport Federation
 List of medalists at the European Shooting Championships
 List of medalists at the European Shotgun Championships

References

External links
Official website
Profile at the European Shooting Confederation

European Shooting Championships
European Shooting Championships
2017 European Shooting Championships
European 10 m Events Championships
Sport in Maribor
European Shooting Championships